Hicham Khaloua Khaloua (born 7 May 1995) is a footballer who plays as a forward for Maghreb Tetouan. Born in Spain, he has represented Morocco at udner-20 and under-23 international levels.

Club career
Born in San Javier, Murcia to Moroccan parents, Hicham started his youth career with local Mar Menor CF, and in 2005 he joined FC Cartagena at the age of 14. On 14 July 2011, after being linked with FC Barcelona, Real Madrid, Málaga CF, Liverpool, Manchester United and Chelsea, he went on a trial at Manchester City, but nothing came of it.

On 2 August 2011, still a junior, Hicham signed for UD Almería. He made his senior debut with the B-team in the 2011–12 season, in Segunda División B.

On 14 July 2013, Hicham signed a new deal with the Andalusians, running until 2018. On 18 December he played his first official game with the main squad, featuring the last 32 minutes in a 0–0 home draw against UD Las Palmas for the campaign's Copa del Rey.

On 24 March 2014, aged 18, Hicham came on as a late substitute in a La Liga home fixture against Real Sociedad, and scored a last-minute 4–3 winner after just three minutes on the pitch on the day of his league debut. On 19 July 2016 he was loaned to another reserve team, Celta de Vigo B also in the third division, with a buyout clause.

On 17 August 2017, after returning from loan, Hicham renewed with Almería until 2021, being definitely promoted to the main squad. The following 11 July, he was loaned to third level club CD Castellón for one year.

On 24 January 2019, Hicham joined fellow third division side UCAM Murcia CF on loan until June. On 31 July, after returning from loan, he terminated his contract with the Rojiblancos, and signed for UD Melilla on 2 August.

On 27 January 2020, Hicham agreed to a 18-month contract with Cádiz CF, being assigned to the B-team in the third tier.

International career
Hicham was called up to the Morocco under-20 team in April 2013, and also appeared with the nation in the 2013 Mediterranean Games, netting five times in as many matches as the tournament ended in conquest. He was also called up to the under-23s in May 2016.

References

External links

1995 births
Living people
People from San Javier, Murcia
Spanish sportspeople of Moroccan descent
Spanish footballers
Moroccan footballers
Footballers from the Region of Murcia
Association football forwards
La Liga players
Segunda División B players
UD Almería B players
UD Almería players
Celta de Vigo B players
CD Castellón footballers
UCAM Murcia CF players
UD Melilla footballers
Cádiz CF B players
Morocco under-20 international footballers
Moroccan expatriate sportspeople in Spain
Mediterranean Games gold medalists for Morocco
Mediterranean Games medalists in football
Competitors at the 2013 Mediterranean Games